Bicton is a civil parish in Shropshire, England.  It contains 36 listed buildings that are recorded in the National Heritage List for England.  Of these, four are listed at Grade II*, the middle of the three grades, and the others are at Grade II, the lowest grade.  The parish contains the village of Bicton and the surrounding countryside.  Most of the listed buildings are houses and associated structures, farmhouses and farm buildings.  The other listed buildings include a former church, now in ruins, and items in its churchyard, and its replacement, a bridge, and two milestones.


Key

Buildings

References

Citations

Sources

Lists of buildings and structures in Shropshire